Jamie Bosio may refer to:

Jamie Bosio (footballer, born March 1991), Gibraltarian football defender
Jamie Bosio (footballer, born September 1991), Gibraltarian futsal coach and former football defensive midfielder